Kamwenge is a town in the Western Region of Uganda. It is the site of the Kamwenge District headquarters.

Location
The coordinates of the town are 0°11'10.0"N, 30°27'14.0"E (Latitude:0.186111; Longitude:30.453889).

Population
The 2002 population of Kamwenge was recorded at about 13,320 by the national population census. In 2010, the Uganda Bureau of Statistics (UBOS) estimated the population at 16,100. In 2011, UBOS estimated the population at 16,300. During the 2014 national population census, the population was put at 19,240.

Points of interest
The following additional points of interest lie within the town or near its borders:
 headquarters of Kamwenge District Administration
 offices of Kamwenge Town Council
 Kamwenge central market
 Kamwenge Campus of Uganda Pentecostal University
 Nyakahita–Kazo–Kamwenge–Fort Portal Road - the  road passes through the town.

See also
 List of cities and towns in Uganda

References

External links
 2002 Populations of the 90 Largest Cities And Towns In Uganda

Populated places in Western Region, Uganda
Cities in the Great Rift Valley
Kamwenge District
Toro sub-region